Daniel Amon Grimsley (April 3, 1840 – February 5, 1910) was a Virginia lawyer, Confederate officer, ten-year member of the Virginia senate and for 23 years judge in Culpeper County.

Early and family life
The son of Baptist minister Barnett Grimsley (1807-18895) and his wife the former Ruth Updike (who had married in 1830). Grimsley had an older brother Thomas F. Grimsley (1835–1913, who had also become a teacher and Baptist minister by 1860) and older sisters Elizabeth (b. 1831) and Martha (b.1838), as well as a younger sister Louisa (b. 1842). His father owned eight slaves in the 1860 census.

Daniel Grimsley married Elizabeth (Bettie) A. Browning, and they had children: Margaret (Maggie) Grimsley Drewry (1868–1941), Virginia (Birdie) L Grimsley Burckmyer (1869–1950), T. Edwin Grimsley (1871–1930), Mary Browning Grimsley Barbour (1873–1962), Frances (Fannie) Grimsley Smith (1875–1952), Elizabeth Barnett Grimsley Theus (1880–1951), and Ethel Grimsley (1882–1894).

Career

As the American Civil War began and Virginia seceded from the Union, Grimsley's elder brother Thomas enlisted almost immediately in the 6th Virginia Cavalry, on May 8, 1861. Daniel Grimsley (who was characterized as a schoolteacher on the 1860 census but as a farmer on the enlistment roll) joined the same unit as a corporal at Manassas, Virginia, on April 22, 1862. He was a member of Payne's Brigade, Fitz Lee's Division. Following the Battle of Front Royal, although Thomas would remain a private for the rest of the war, Daniel was promoted to sergeant on June 20, 1862. He was wounded at least twice, and also frequently assigned to court martial duty. Daniel Grimsley was promoted to Captain on April 20, 1862, and to Major on June 4, 1864.

After the  war, Grimsley read law under commonwealth attorney Horatio G. Moffet (1808–1892) of Rappahannock County, Virginia. Following admission to the Virginia bar, Grimsley moved to Culpeper and practiced law with James Barbour.

After adoption of the Virginia Constitution of 1869 and the Commonwealth's readmission to the Union, Culpeper County's voters elected Grimsley to represent them in the Virginia Senate. He served from 1869 and was re-elected twice times, serving for a decade. He ran again in 1885, this time to represent Culpeper County in the House of Delegates.

Not long afterward, fellow legislators elected him a judge of the Circuit Court in Culpeper, so his longtime law partner (and later in-law) James Barbour resumed the seat he had held before the American Civil War. Grimsley served as a judge in Culpeper for 23 years.

Death and legacy

Judge Grimsley experienced a stroke on February 2, 1910, and died three days later at his home. He was survived by his wife, son Capt. T. Edward Grimsley (who had become a lawyer by 1900) and five daughters. He is buried in Fairview Cemetery in Culpeper, and joined by his elder brother Thomas three years later.

References

1840 births
1910 deaths
People from Culpeper, Virginia
Members of the Virginia House of Delegates
People of Virginia in the American Civil War
19th-century American politicians
19th-century American judges
20th-century American judges
People from Rappahannock County, Virginia
American lawyers admitted to the practice of law by reading law